The Sacred Heart of Jesus, Church is a historic Roman Catholic Church situated at Madanthyar near Belthangady. The church was built on  29 January 1893. This church comes under Deanery of Belthangady, Roman Catholic Diocese of Mangalore. This church is dedicated to Sacred Heart of Jesus.

History
Sacred Heart of Jesus church was part of Agrar Church until 1886 and the priest from Agrar Church used to visit these villages once a year to bless the graves at the cemetery opened by local Catholics, to bless the houses and to celebrate.  Later, the local Catholics obtained permission from the Archbishop of Goa to build a chapel here, to be served from Agrar Church.  Fr. Emilian Alexander DSouza of Agrar Church had chosen  a site for the chapel.  The Concordat of 1886 came into operation and Agrar Church was transferred to the Diocese of Mangalore.  So the people appealed to Bishop Nicholas Pagani SJ and he detached the area from Agrar Church and placed it under the care of Fr. Pascal Mascarenhas, the parish priest of Gaddai (Belthangady).  Fr. Pascal Mascarenhas used to go occasionally to Madanthyar and offer mass in a shed in 1887.  The people wanted an independent parish.

Mr Francis Dsouza Prabhu (Porso Porob) of Kolkebail endowed his vast property to the new parish. On 16 March 1889, Fr Rosario D’Souza was appointed the first parish priest.

Fr Jacob Sequeira (1890-1900) constructed the church and it was blessed by Bishop Pagani sj on 29 January 1893.  He was successful in securing 50 acres of land for the parish.  There were Konkani speaking and Tulu speaking Catholic families in the parish.

The seventh parish priest Fr Denis D’Souza (1925–1942) bought some land for the new church and started the construction of the church and the presbytery.  The incomplete church and the presbytery were blessed by Bishop Victor Fernandes on 7 May 1940.  Fr Gasper Baptist Pinto (1942-1959) completed the presbytery and flooring work of the new church. The present new presbytery is built by Fr Charles Noronha.

Demographics
The parish has 673 families with a population of 3500 members. The parish consists 23 wards.

Significance
Fr. Jacob Sequeuira began Guardian Angels’ Primary School in a small shed in 1898. 
Fr. Denis Dsouza had upgraded the school to Higher Primary level and took over St Antony’s School at Gardady in 1920.
In 1927 Fr. Denis Dsouza established St Joseph’s Primary School at Nainadu.
The Guardian Angels’ new School building was inaugurated during the tenure of Fr Ligory D'Souza (1977-1983) on 25 January 1980.
St Joseph’s and St Anthony’s Schools were upgraded to Higher Primary level on 4 July 1981.
Permissions for Sacred Heart High School, P.U. College and Degree College were obtained by Fr Ligoury Dsouza.  The buildings for both the colleges were done during the time of  Fr Fred V. Pereira, who rendered service as a parish priest and correspondent of the educational institutions (1983–1992).

Parish Associations
The parish community are engaged in social service, helping the poor and other services which helps the needy. The list of associations in this parish is below.
 St Vincent De Paul Society
 Marian Sodality
 Women's Association
 Catholic Sabha
 Altar Boys
 Legion of Mary
 Young Catholic Students Movement
 ICYM
 Medical Relief Fund
 Maria Kripa Salesian Sisters
 Small Christian Community (Started in 2000)

Former Parish Priests
  Fr. Rosario D’Souza 1890–1890
  Fr. Jacob Sequeira  1890–1901
  Fr. Rosario Lewis  1901–1903
  Fr. Joseph P Fernandes 1903–1906
  Fr. Aloysius E Menezes  1906–1923
  Fr. Denis J D'Souza  1923–1942
  Fr. Gasper Baptist Pinto  25-1-1942 – 10-5-1959
  Fr. William E Veigas  10-5-1959 – 10-5-1972
  Fr. Ligory D'Souza  10-5-1972 – 25-7-1983
  Fr. Fred V Pereira  3-6-1983 – 25-5-1992
  Fr. Alexander Lobo  25-5-1992 – 13-6-1994
  Fr. Charles Noronha  4-7-1994 – 1-6-2001
  Fr. Harold Mascarenhas  1-6-2001 – 14-5-2005
  Fr. Valerian Frank  14-5-2005 – 29-5-2010
  Fr. Lawrence Mascarenhas 
  Fr. Basil vas is the present parish priest.

See also
Roman Catholicism in Mangalore
Goan Catholics
Roman Catholic Diocese of Udupi
Roman Catholic Archdiocese of Bangalore
Most Holy Redeemer Church, Belthangady
Deanery of Belthangady

References

Churches in Mangalore Diocese
Religious organizations established in 1893
1893 establishments in India